The Origins of Virtue is a 1996 popular science book by Matt Ridley, which has been recognised as a classic in its field.  In the book, Ridley explores the issues surrounding the development of human morality. The book, written from a sociobiological viewpoint, explores how genetics can be used to explain certain traits of human behaviour, in particular morality and altruism.

Starting from the premise that society can on a simplistic level be represented as a variant of the prisoner's dilemma, Ridley examines how it has been possible for a society to arise in which people choose to co-operate rather than defect.

Ridley examines the history of different attempts which have been made to explain the fact that humans in society do not defect, looking at various computer generated models which have been used to explain how such behaviour could arise. In particular he looks at systems based on the idea of tit for tat, where members of the group only cooperate with those who also cooperate and exclude those who do not. This allows altruistic behaviour to develop, and causes the optimum solution to the dilemma, to no longer be to defect but instead to cooperate. He applies this to humans and suggests that genes which generated altruistic-tit for tat behaviour would be likely to be passed on and therefore give rise to the kind of behaviour we see today.

From this argument Ridley argues that society operates best in groups of around 150 individuals, which he suggests is the level at which humans are capable of being sure about which members to cooperate with and which to exclude. Although he avoids drawing any specific political points, Ridley ends his book by arguing for a smaller state operating on a more local level.

References

External links
New York Times May 11, 1997 (Review)
Jack Hirshleifer (1997) UCLA Working Paper 771 (Review)
L. Markoczy & J. Goldberg (1997) The virtue of human universals and cooperation: A review essay of Matt Ridley's The Origins of Virtue

See also
 Animal Faith
 Evolutionary ethics
 Evolution of morality

1996 non-fiction books
Books about evolution
Books about sociobiology
Books by Matt Ridley
Ethics books
Moral psychology books